Jaroslav Zvěřina  (born 18 December 1942 in Třebíč) is a Czech politician and former Member of the European Parliament with the Civic Democratic Party, part of the European Democrats and sits on the European Parliament's Committee on Legal Affairs. He was candidate also in European Parliament election in 2009, but he was not reelected.

He is a substitute for the Committee on Culture and Education and a vice-chair of the Delegation for relations with Japan.

Education
 1965: Doctor of Medicine (Faculty of Medicine, Charles University, Hradec Králové)
 1990: holder of the postgraduate qualification 'Candidate of Sciences' and senior lecturer (First Faculty of Medicine, Charles University, Prague)

Career
 1965–1969: Doctor
 1969–1977: Specialised doctor
 1977–1992: Research fellow
 since 1989: Head of the Institute of Sexology of the First Faculty of Medicine, Charles University, Prague
 since 1994: Chairman of the Tábor district association of ODS (Civic Democratic Party)
 since 1994: Member of Tábor Town Council
 1998: Vice-Chairman of the Chamber of Deputies of the Parliament of the Czech Republic
 1998–2002: Chairman of the Committee for European Integration of the Chamber of Deputies of the Parliament of the Czech Republic
 2002–2004: Vice-Chairman of the Committee for European Affairs of the Chamber of Deputies of the Parliament of the Czech Republic
 since 1990: Chairman of the Sexological Society of the Czech Medical Association
 since 2001: Member of the supervisory board of the benevolent society 'Česká hlava'

Cooperation
Konrad Adenauer Foundation

See also
 2004 European Parliament election in the Czech Republic

External links
 
 
 

1942 births
Living people
Czech sexologists
Politicians from Třebíč
Civic Democratic Party (Czech Republic) MEPs
MEPs for the Czech Republic 2004–2009
Charles University alumni